The following highways are numbered 543:

Australia
 Omeo Highway

Canada
Alberta Highway 543

United States